Culicoides hondurensis is a species of Culicoides.

References

hondurensis
Insects described in 2004